Sharon van Essen (born 3 March 1981) is a former Dutch cyclist from Utrecht, the Netherlands. She turned professional in 2000 with the Farm Frites-Hartol team.

Palmarès

2001
1st Sparkassen Giro Bochum

2005
2nd Dutch National Road Race Championships

2006 (Vrienden van het Platteland)
31st World University Cycling Championship, road race

2nd Dutch National Road Race Championships

References

1981 births
Living people
Dutch female cyclists
Sportspeople from Utrecht (city)
Cyclists from Utrecht (province)